Graeme Paton is a British journalist, and Transport Correspondent for The Times. He was formerly Education Editor of the Daily Telegraph, which he joined in 2006.

He was educated at a comprehensive school in Warrington, then the University of Hull.

References

External links 

 
 Daily Telegraph profile
 

Living people
British male journalists
Alumni of the University of Hull
Year of birth missing (living people)
Place of birth missing (living people)
The Daily Telegraph people